Macaduma tortricoides is a moth of the subfamily Arctiinae. It was described by Rothschild in 1912. It is found on New Guinea.

References

Macaduma
Moths described in 1912